The 1991 Hall of Fame Bowl featured the fourteenth-ranked Clemson Tigers and the sixteenth-ranked Illinois Fighting Illini. It was the fifth edition of the Hall of Fame Bowl.

Clemson's Chris Gardocki kicked an 18-yard field goal as the Tigers built a 3–0 lead. They led 10–0 after DeChane Cameron threw a 14-yard touchdown pass to Doug Thomas. In the second quarter, Clemson got another touchdown pass from Cameron, and a 34-yard interception return from Arlington Nunn giving Clemson a 24–0 halftime lead. Gardocki kicked field goals of 26 and 43 yards in the third and fourth quarter, respectively, as Clemson pulled away for a 30–0 victory.

Hall of Fame Bowl
ReliaQuest Bowl
Clemson Tigers football bowl games
Illinois Fighting Illini football bowl games
January 1991 sports events in the United States
Hall of Fame Bowl
20th century in Tampa, Florida